Ayomide Emmanuel Bello (born 4 April 2002) is a Nigerian canoeist. She competed in the women's C-1 200 metres event at the 2020 Summer Olympics held in Tokyo, Japan.

In 2018, she won two gold medals at the African Youth Games. In that same year, she represented Nigeria at the 2018 Summer Youth Olympics and competed in four events: the girls' C1 sprint, girls' C1 slalom, girls' K1 sprint and girls' K1 slalom. She did not win a medal in these events.

She competed at the 2019 African Games and won the gold medals in the C-1 200 metres and C-1 500 metres events. She also won the gold medals in the C-2 200 metres and C-2 500 metres events. As a result the country finished second in the canoeing medal table at the 2019 African Games and she also qualified for the 2020 Tokyo Olympics in the C-1 200 metres.

References 

2002 births
Living people
Nigerian female canoeists
Canoeists at the 2018 Summer Youth Olympics
African Games gold medalists for Nigeria
African Games medalists in canoeing
Competitors at the 2019 African Games
Canoeists at the 2020 Summer Olympics
Olympic canoeists of Nigeria
21st-century Nigerian women